Ricky Allen Seilheimer is an American former professional baseball catcher. He was drafted in the first round of the 1979 Major League Baseball Draft by the Chicago White Sox. His one major league home run came off future Hall of Fame pitcher Ferguson Jenkins. Although he continued to play in the White Sox organization until , he never again played in the major leagues after 1980.

Sources

1960 births
Living people
American expatriate baseball players in Canada
Baseball players from Texas
Birmingham Barons players
Chicago White Sox players
Denver Zephyrs players
Edmonton Trappers players
Glens Falls White Sox players
Major League Baseball catchers
Niagara Falls Pirates players
People from Brenham, Texas